Open Hall-Red Cliffe is a local service district and designated place in the Canadian province of Newfoundland and Labrador.

History
Open Hall was settled around 1770 by Joseph Batt. Joseph Batt held a fishing room in Greenspond in 1769, however he moved from there to Open Hall in the next year. As a result, a nook in Open Hall Harbour arrived in his name, Joe Batts Cove.

It is likely that Open Hall was settled long before this date by French fishermen. However this was not recorded by British Authorities because of disputes over the territory. The original name of the settlement was Open Hole. This name was given by Dorset fishermen who colonized Bonavista Bay. Open Hole is translated from the French name " La Bonne Eau" which means Good Water.

Geography 
Open Hall-Red Cliffe is in Newfoundland within Subdivision F of Division No. 7. It is a fishing community located on the southern side of Bonavista Bay. Open Hall is about 30 km southwest of Bonavista. Open Hall has a relatively safe harbour, which is suitable for small-boat fishing. The landscape is rough. However, there is agricultural land which has been used since the start of the settlement.

Demographics 

Government 
Open Hall-Red Cliffe is a local service district (LSD) that is governed by a committee responsible for the provision of certain services to the community.

See also 
List of communities in Newfoundland and Labrador
List of designated places in Newfoundland and Labrador
List of local service districts in Newfoundland and Labrador

References

External links 
Open Hall site

Designated places in Newfoundland and Labrador
Fishing communities in Canada
Local service districts in Newfoundland and Labrador